Jazzhattan Suite is a big band jazz album composed and arranged by Oliver Nelson and performed by the  Jazz Interactions Orchestra. It was recorded in late 1967 and released in 1968 on Verve Records.

Track listing
"A Typical Day in New York " - 4:45
"The East Side/The West Side" - 4:12
"125th and 7th Avenue" - 6:38
"A Penthouse Dawn" - 3:09
"One for Duke" - 5:26
"Complex City" - 8:10

Recorded on November 13 (#2-6) and November 14 (#1), 1967.

Personnel
Oliver Nelson - arranger
Joe Newman - conductor, trumpet
Burt Collins, Ray Copeland, Ernie Royal, Marvin Stamm - trumpet
Jimmy Cleveland, Paul Faulise, Benny Powell, Wayne Andre - trombone
Ray Alonge, Jim Buffington - French horn
Don Butterfield - tuba
Phil Woods - alto saxophone, clarinet
Jerry Dodgion - alto saxophone, clarinet, flute
George Marge - tenor saxophone, flute, clarinet
Zoot Sims - tenor saxophone
Danny Bank - baritone saxophone, flute, bass clarinet
Patti Bown - piano
Ron Carter, George Duvivier - bass
Ed Shaughnessy - drums
Bobby Rosengarden - percussion, vibes

References

1967 albums
Verve Records albums
Oliver Nelson albums